Odozana floccosa is a moth of the subfamily Arctiinae. It was described by Francis Walker in 1864. It is found in Panama and Tefé, Brazil.

References

Lithosiini
Moths described in 1864